Cygnus is the Latin word for swan and may refer to:

Astronomy 
 Cygnus (constellation), a northern constellation
 Cygnus A, a radio galaxy within the constellation
 Cygnus X (star complex), a star complex within the constellation
 Cygnus X-1, a binary system within the constellation
 Cygnus X-3, a binary system within the constellation

Business & industry 
 Cygnus 20, a Canadian sailboat design
 Cygnus (spacecraft), a space vehicle developed by Orbital Sciences Corporation and Thales Alenia Space
 Cygnus Air or Gestair Cargo, a Spanish cargo airline
 Cygnus Business Media, a U.S.-based business-to-business publishing company
 Cygnus Solutions, a company that provided commercial support for free software and the original developer of Cygwin

Other uses
 Cygnus (genus), the genus of most swans
 Cygnus (mythology) or Cycnus, a number of characters in Greek mythology
 Cygnus X-1 (song series), a 1977–1978 two-part song series by Rush
 Cygnus X (music group), a trance music project
 Cygnus (spacecraft), an expendable spacecraft
 USS Cygnus, a fictional starship in The Black Hole
 Empress Cygnus, a non-player character in the game MapleStory
Cygnus gas field, a UK North Sea gas field
Cygnus, Colombian Folk Rock/Metal Band

See also 

 Cyclone Global Navigation Satellite System (CYGNSS), a hurricane study satellite constellation in development by NASA
 Cygnet (disambiguation)
 Cygwin
Swan (disambiguation)

ru:Cygnus